Budelière (Auvergnat: Budeliere) is a commune in the Creuse department in the Nouvelle-Aquitaine region in central France.

Geography
Between 1905 and 1955, the commune had a goldmine at Le Chatelet, which produced 11 tonnes of gold in those years. 
The commune is served by a TER railway.

Population

Sights

 The church, dating from the nineteenth century.
 The church at St.Radegonde, dating from the twelfth century.
 The church of St.Martial at Le Châtelet, dating from the twelfth century.
 The château de la Villederie.
 The chapel of Saint-Marien.

See also
Communes of the Creuse department

References

External links

Official website of the commune of Budelière 

Communes of Creuse